Hungary competed at the 1984 Summer Paralympics in Stoke Mandeville, Great Britain and New York City, United States. 26 competitors from Hungary won 29 medals including 13 gold, 11 silver and 5 bronze and finished 18th in the medal table.

See also 
 Hungary at the Paralympics
 Hungary at the 1984 Summer Olympics

References 

Hungary at the Paralympics
1984 in Hungarian sport
Nations at the 1984 Summer Paralympics